Hudson station is a commuter rail station operated by Exo in Hudson, Quebec, Canada. 

It is served by the Vaudreuil–Hudson line, with one round trip train per day.

Hudson became the new terminus of the Vaudreuil-Hudson Line on June 30, 2010, after the town of Rigaud was unable to pay its annual fee to the former AMT to continue train service to Rigaud station.

Bus connections

CIT La Presqu'Île

References

External links
 Hudson Commuter Train Station Information (RTM)
 Hudson Commuter Train Station Schedule (RTM)

Exo commuter rail stations
Railway stations in Montérégie